Posad is a rural locality (a village) in Chekuyevskoye Rural Settlement of Onezhsky District, Arkhangelsk Oblast, Russia. The population was 119 as of 2010. There are 4 streets.

Geography 
Posad is located on the Onega River, 143 km southeast of Onega (the district's administrative centre) by road. Tselyagino is the nearest rural locality.

References 

Rural localities in Onezhsky District
Onezhsky Uyezd